Allan Ryan may refer to:

 Allan Ryan (attorney) (1945−2023), American attorney
 Allan A. Ryan Jr. (1903−1981), New York Senator and financier

See also
Alan Ryan (disambiguation)